The Fall of Baiji was a battle that took place in and around Baiji, Iraq in June 2014. It was fought between  Islamic State of Iraq and the Levant (ISIL) forces and those of the Iraqi government. Its first stage included clashes in the city from 11 to 18June. The second stage was fighting over the control of Baiji oil refinery from 18 to 21June. ISIL captured both the town and the refinery. On 19June 2014, the Iraqi Army retook the a refinery in a counter-attack. Fighting continued in Baiji until October 2014, when government forces finally established control, which they have maintained since.

Background 

On 4June 2014, the Islamic State of Iraq and the Levant (ISIL) and its allies attacked Mosul launching their northern Iraq offensive. The following day, they started the Salahuddin campaign in Saladin. ISIL and its allies captured Mosul on 10June 2014. after a six-day battle. When the city fell, there were reports that the group was advancing from Mosul to Kirkuk. After capturing the city, the group freed nearly 1,000 prisoners. On 11June, ISIL and its allies also started the siege of Amirli.

The Battle 
On 11June, around 60 ISIL vehicles entered the city of Baiji. They set the main court house and police station on fire. They also took control of Baiji prison and freed all 2,400 inmates. Later that day, the militants reportedly retreated from Baiji, before the Iraqi Army's Fourth Armored Division arrived in the city, allegedly due to persuasion from local tribal leaders. However, the next day it was confirmed ISIL was still in control of the town.

On 18June, ISIL attacked the oil refinery near Baiji. An official inside the refinery stated the militants had captured 75 percent of the facility, while a military spokesman claimed the attack had been repelled, with 40 militants killed. On 19June, Iraqi government forces launched a counter-attack and claimed to have regained full control of the oil refinery after heavy fighting that left 100 militants dead. ISIL created watchtowers and checkpoints within Baiji. On 20June 2014, ISIL forces surrounded the refinery and attacked it for a second time, but failed to capture it. They launched a third attack on 21June, killing 36 Iraqi soldiers, but failed to recapture the refinery.

Aftermath  

In the months following the battle, Iraq and ISIL continued fighting in the area. Control of Baiji switched between the two sides. The Iraqi government and the Popular Mobilization Forces retook Baiji in October 2015. Since then, the city has been under Iraqi control but has faced periodic ISIL attacks. The city's infrastructure has been severely damaged by the prolonged fighting.

References 

Baiji, Fall of
Military operations of the Iraqi Civil War in 2014
Military operations of the War in Iraq (2013–2017) involving the Islamic State of Iraq and the Levant
June 2014 events in Iraq
Baiji, Fall of (1st)